Karl Johann Greith (b. at Rapperswil, Switzerland, 25 May 1807; d. at St. Gallen, 17 May 1882) was a Swiss Catholic bishop and church historian.

Life
He received his early education at St. Gall, then went to the lyceum at Lucerne and the University of Munich; at the university he studied theology, philosophy, and history, and met Joseph Görres. In 1829 he went to Paris to perfect himself in library work; while there he decided to enter the priesthood and completed his theological studies in the Sulpician seminary of that city. He was ordained priest in 1831, and was made sub-librarian of St. Gall, also sub-regent and professor of the ecclesiastical seminary.

During the ecclesiastico-political troubles which soon after arose in Switzerland, Greith was prominent with pen and voice in defence of the Catholic Church. He was, consequently, deprived of his offices. He went to Rome, at the instance of the English Government, for the purpose of collecting documents in the Roman libraries and archives relating to English history. After the restoration of peace he devoted himself to parochial work in St. Gall, was made dean of the cathedral in 1847, professor of philosophy in 1853, and was consecrated Bishop of St. Gall in 1862.

From early years he had been an intimate friend of Ignaz von Döllinger, and at the First Vatican Council he held, in regard to the question of papal infallibility, that a dogmatic decision was inadvisable under existing circumstances. However, he accepted the decision of the council and tried to induce Döllinger to do the same.

Greith was a strong champion of ecclesiastical interests and defended the Church against civil power. He could not prevent the suppression of his seminary for boys nor hinder the civil prohibition of missions and retreats; nevertheless he renewed the religious life of his diocese and called into being an educated clergy.

Works

He devoted himself to the study of history and corresponded with numerous scholars, among others Lasaberg, Pertz, Böhmer, Franz Pfeiffer, Schosser, Mone, Gall Morel, and others. His numerous ecclesiastico-political writings were only of transient importance, and they bear witness to his Catholic sentiments.

In his sermons and pastoral letters he laid great stress on the greatness and majesty of God as exhibited in the Redemption and in the founding and continuous activity of the Catholic Church. He published: "Katholische Apologetik in Kanzelreden" in three volumes (Schaffhausen, 1847–52); he also wrote, in collaboration with the Benedictine Georg Ulber, "Handbuch der Philosophie fur die Schule und das Leben" (Freiburg, 1853–57).

Greith had no sympathy with scholastic philosophy and esteemed Descartes and Leibnitz.

His best and most lasting work was done in history. Among his historical publications were: "Spicilegium Vaticanum, Beiträge zur näheren Kenntniss der vatikanischen Bibliothek für deutsche Poesie des Mittelalters" (Frauenfeld, 1838); "Die deutsche Mystik im Predigerorden" (Freiburg, 1861); "Der heilge Gallus (St. Gall, 1864); "Die heiligen Glauensboten Columban und Gall (St. Gall, 1865); "Geschichte der altirischen Kirche und ihrer Verbindung mit Rom, Gallien und Alemannien, 430-630 (Freiburg, 1867). This last work is an exhaustive study of the foreign relations of the early Roman Catholic Church in Ireland, especially its relations with Rome and its missionary work.

References

Baumgartner, Erinnerungen an Karl Johann Greith in Stimmen aus Maria-Laach, XXIV, XXVI
Rothenflue in Historisch-politische Blatter, XC, a bibliography of Greith's addresses, sermons, Lenten and pastoral letters.

External links
Catholic Encyclopedia source
Catholic Hierarchy page 

1797 births
1882 deaths
19th-century Roman Catholic bishops in Switzerland